Jonathan Oliver is a British science fiction, fantasy and horror author and editor.

Biography
After five years working for Taylor & Francis academic publishers, Oliver started working for Rebellion Developments as Graphic Novels Editor on the 2000 AD line in 2006, and launched the Abaddon Books genre fiction imprint. When Rebellion bought the Solaris Books imprint from BL Publishing, Oliver became Editor-in-Chief of both the Abaddon and Solaris imprints.

Oliver's first book as author, Twilight of Kerberos: The Call of Kerberos, the sixth book in Abaddon's Twilight of Kerberos series, was published in October 2009. In September 2010, Abaddon announced the sequel, Twilight of Kerberos: The Wrath of Kerberos, also by Oliver, for a November 2011 publication date. The book has been described as the "beginning of the end" of the shared world series' overarching storyline.

Oliver's first anthology as editor, The End of the Line: An Anthology of Underground Horror, was launched by Solaris at Fantasycon in Nottingham in September 2010. In October 2010, Solaris announced Oliver's second anthology, House of Fear: An Anthology of Haunted House Stories, due for publication in October 2011.

Bibliography

As author

Twilight of Kerberos: The Call of Kerberos (October 2009, Abaddon Books)
Twilight of Kerberos: The Wrath of Kerberos (Date TBC, Abaddon Books)

As editor

The End of the Line: An Anthology of Underground Horror (September 2010, Solaris Books)
House of Fear: An Anthology of Haunted House Stories (Date TBC, Solaris Books)

Notes

References

 

Living people
21st-century English novelists
English short story writers
English fantasy writers
English horror writers
English book editors
English male short story writers
English male novelists
21st-century British short story writers
21st-century English male writers
English male non-fiction writers
Year of birth missing (living people)